The Museum of Modern and Contemporary Art in Nusantara or Museum MACAN is an art museum at Kebon Jeruk in Jakarta, Indonesia. The museum is the first in Indonesia to have a collection of modern and contemporary Indonesian and international art. It has a floor area of 7,107 square meters with display area of about 4,000 square meters. The museum is included in a list of the World’s 100 Greatest Places 2018 released by Time magazine. Museum MACAN opened in November 2017.

Artworks 
The museum displays around 90 works from a collection totalling 800 modern Indonesian and contemporary artworks from around the world including 'Infinity Mirrored Room' by Japanese artist Yayoi Kusama.

Paintings 
The museum houses collections of paintings such as:

 Great Criticism: Coca-Cola, Wang Guangyi
 Baguio Market, Fernando C. Amasolo
 Peta Bali dengan Mata Angin, Miguel Covarrubias
 Wipe Out #1, FX Harsono
 China China, Zhu Wei
 Lanskap Hindia, Raden Saleh
 Kantor Pos Jawa, Raden Saleh
 Swallow's Nest, Yayoi Kusama
Thought and Method, Xu Bing

Performance and installation arts 
Contemporary and modern art displayed by the MACAN museum is not limited to paintings, but also includes contemporary styles using various media, techniques, and installation art.

Various performances and installation arts that has performed in the museum:
Art Turns, World Turns, Exploring the Collection of the Museum Macan
 Seven Stories, Lee Mingwei
 One Million Years, On Kawara
 The Past Has Not Passed, Arahmaiani
 Life Heart Rainbow, Yayoi Kusama
 Dunia Dalam Berita

References

2017 establishments in Indonesia
Art museums established in 2017
Buildings and structures completed in 2017
Museums in Jakarta
Modern art museums
Contemporary art galleries in Asia
Art museums and galleries in Indonesia